The AMS Centennial Research Fellowship is presented annually to outstanding mathematicians who have held the doctoral degree for between three and twelve years. The primary selection criterion is excellence in research achievement.

A Research Fellowship Fund was established by the American Mathematical Society in 1973.

Previous awards
2023 - 2024  Joel Nagloo
2022 - 2023  Mimi Dai
2021 - 2022  Aaron J Pollack
2020 - 2021  Ilya Khayutin
2019 - 2020  Piotr Przytycki
2018 - 2019  Nguyen, Toan
2017 - 2018  Takeda, Shuichiro
2016 - 2017  Lubetzky, Eyal
2015 - 2016  Schnell, Christian; Lee, Kyungyong
2014 - 2015  Juschenko, Kate
2013 - 2014  Zhu, Xinwen
2012 - 2013  Melnick, Karin
2011 - 2012  Toms, Andrew
2010 - 2011  Bellaiche, Joel
2009 - 2010  Montalban, Antonio
2008 - 2009  Hoffman, Christopher
2007 - 2008  Kassabov, Martin
2006 - 2007  Hacon, Christopher; Kra, Bryna
2005 - 2006  Lee, Yuan-Pin; Popa, Mihnea
2004 - 2005  Baik, Jinho; Kitchloo, Nitu
2003 - 2004  Kim, Henry; Meier, John
2002 - 2003  Fannjiang, Albert; Gan, Wee Teck; Ramakrishna, Ravi
2001 - 2002  Dimitrov, Ivan; Vakil, Ravi; Wu, Jiahong; Zhu, Meijun
2000 - 2001  Fu, Siqi; Herald, Christopher; Ruan, Wei-Dong; Strela, Vasily
1999 - 2000  Rezk, Charles; Wang, Bin; Wang, Changyou; Yang, Tonghai
1998 - 1999  de Cataldo, Mark; Garoufalidis, Stavros; Kovács, Sándor; Li, Yanguang
1997 - 1998  Costin, Ovidiu; Diamond, Fred; Liu, Gang; Shen, Zhongwei;
1996 - 1997  Hu, Yi; McCann, Robert; Voronov, Alexander; Wang, Jiaping
1995 - 1996  de la Llave, Rafael; McCallum, William Gordon; Orr, Kent
1994 - 1995  Bauman, Patricia; Marker, David
1993 - 1994  Hurtubise, Jacques; Scedrov, Andre; Webb, David
1992 - 1993  Burdzy, Krzysztof; William Menasco; David Morrison
1991 - 1992  Bump, Daniel; Vilonen, Kari
1990 - 1991  Anderson, Michael; Gordon, Carolyn; Mitchell, Steven
1989 - 1990  Efrat, Isaac; Lee, John; Spatzier, Ralf
1988 - 1989  Bell, Steven; Blasius, Don; Gabai, David
1987 - 1988  Hain, Richard; Jacob, Bill
1986 - 1987  Ramakrishnan, Dinakar
1985 - 1986  Beals, Michael
1984 - 1985  Durrett, Richard
1983 - 1984  Lyons, Russell
1982 - 1983  Kuhn, Nicholas
1981 - 1982  Ein, Lawrence; Williams, Mark
1980 - 1981  Lazarsfeld, Robert; Parker, Thomas; Sachs, Robert
1979 - 1980  Brown, Scott; Hoffstein, Jeffrey; Kahn, Jeffry; McClure, James; Smith, Rick
1978 - 1979  Dankner, Alan; Harbater, David; Hiller, Howard; Kerckhoff, Steven; McOwen, Robert
1977 - 1978  Kalikow, Steven; Patton, Charles; Phong, Duong-Hong; Vogan, David
1976 - 1977  Ancel, Fredric; Sgro, Joseph
1975 - 1976  Gaffney, Terence; Nèvai, Paul; Reed, George
1974 - 1975  Abramson, Fred; Wang, James Li-Ming

See also

 List of mathematics awards

References

Awards of the American Mathematical Society
Fellowships